The Airco DH.1 was an early military biplane of typical "Farman" pattern flown by Britain's Royal Flying Corps during World War I. By the time the powerplant for which it was designed was sufficiently plentiful it was obsolete as an operational aircraft, and apart from a few examples sent to the Middle East it served as a trainer and Home Defence fighter.

Design and development
Geoffrey de Havilland was one of the pioneering designers at the Royal Aircraft Factory and was partially or wholly responsible for most prewar "Factory" designs. When he left to become chief designer at The Aircraft Manufacturing Company (Airco) in 1914, his first design was strongly reminiscent of the F.E.2, one of the last designs on which he had worked at the Royal Aircraft Factory.

Like the F.E.2, the DH.1 was of pusher configuration, accommodating its pilot and observer in two open tandem cockpits in the nose.  The observer's cockpit was stepped down below the pilot's and equipped with a machine gun. The wings were of typical fabric-covered, two-bay, unstaggered, unswept, equal span design, while the stabiliser and rudder were carried on the end of two long, open-framework booms. The type, like the F.E.2b, was designed for the water-cooled Beardmore 120 hp (89 kW) inline engine. However, all available Beardmore engines were required for F.E.2b and R.E.5 production, so the air-cooled Renault 70 hp (52 kW) V8 engine was installed instead.

The prototype was fitted with aerofoils attached to the side of the nacelle which could be rotated through 90 degrees to act as air brakes, an unusual feature for the time, although they were soon removed. It had a fixed conventional landing gear with the mainwheels carried on V-struts, using coil springs and oleos for the suspension.

In January 1915 Geoffrey de Havilland piloted the D.H.1 prototype on its first flight at Hendon. Although the Renault engine left it underpowered, performance was still reasonable and the type was ordered into production, with an initial order of 49 being placed. Airco was already occupied with building and designing other aircraft, so DH.1 production was undertaken by Savages Limited of King's Lynn, which had previously manufactured fairground equipment. These aircraft used a simpler rubber cord suspension, and had a revised cockpit coaming to give a better field of fire for the observer's gun. Production was initially very slow, and only five examples of the type had reached the RFC by the end of 1915.

Later production machines were fitted with the Beardmore engine, as originally intended, as these had become more plentiful. This version was redesignated the DH.1A. Although testing of the DH.1A showed it to be at least as good as the F.E.2b, this was hardly a recommendation, as the F.E. was itself already slated for replacement with more modern tractor types. Nonetheless, a further order for 50 DH.1As was placed with Savages. By the time of the DH.1's first flight, a single-seat "follow-up" was already being considered; and by June 1915 the first D.H.2 had already made its maiden flight. Designed essentially as a smaller version of the D.H.1, the D.H. 2 was to become of one of the most important British fighters of the period.

Operational history
The DH.1 saw operational service only in the Middle East theatre, where six Beardmore-powered DH.1As arrived in July 1916. These were used by No. 14 Squadron RFC as escorts for their B.E.2 reconnaissance aircraft. An Aviatik two-seater was claimed by a 14 Squadron D.H.1A on 2 August 1916 for the only known victory of the type. The last known action by a DH.1 was on 5 March 1917, when one was shot down during a bombing raid on Tel el Sheria. No. 14 Squadron became an R.E.8 unit in November 1917; it seems probable that the last operational DH.1 had gone before that date.

The other DH.1s served in training, with 43 aircraft allotted and Home Defence units in the United Kingdom receiving an additional 24 aircraft, finally being withdrawn from service in 1918.

Variants
DH.1
Prototype and early-production aircraft powered by 70hp Renault engine.
DH.1A
Some 70 production examples powered by a 120hp Beardmore engine
Total production was one prototype and 99 DH.1 and DH.1As, all production examples built by Savages.

Operators

Australian Flying Corps
No. 1 Squadron AFC operated a single aircraft (no. 4620) from June to July 1916.

Royal Flying Corps
No. 14 Squadron RFC

Specifications (DH.1)

See also

References
Notes

Citations

Bibliography

 Bruce, J.M. The Aeroplanes of the Royal Flying Corps (Military Wing). London: Putnam, 1982. .
 Grey, C. G. Jane's All the World's Aircraft 1919 (reprint). New York: Arco Publishing Company, 1969. . 
 Jackson, A. J. De Havilland Aircraft since 1909. London: Putnam, Third edition, 1987. .
 Lamberton, W. M. Reconnaissance & Bomber Aircraft of the 1914–1918 War. Letchworth, UK: Harleyford, 1962.
 Mason, Francis K. The British Fighter since 1912. Annapolis, Maryland, USA: Naval Institute Press, 1992. .
 Taylor, Michael J. H. Jane's Encyclopedia of Aviation, 1989 edition. London: Studio Editions, 1989, p. 45. .

External links

 Airco DH.1

DH.001
1910s British military reconnaissance aircraft
1910s British fighter aircraft
Single-engined pusher aircraft
Biplanes
Aircraft first flown in 1915